Lale Mansur (née Yurdatapan; born 1956) is a Turkish actress. She has appeared in more than twenty films since 1988.

Selected filmography

References

External links 

1956 births
Living people
Turkish former Muslims
Turkish agnostics
Turkish film actresses
Best Actress Golden Orange Award winners